In Greek mythology, Eirene (/aɪˈriːni/; Greek: Εἰρήνη, Eirēnē, [eːrɛ́ːnɛː], lit. "Peace") or Irene, was a daughter of Zeus and Themis, daughter of Alpheus. She gave her name to Eirene, a small island near Crete. The island was later called Anthedonia and Hypereia, but eventually received the name Calauria after Calaurus, who was also a son of Poseidon.

Note

References 

 Lucius Mestrius Plutarchus, Moralia with an English Translation by Frank Cole Babbitt. Cambridge, MA. Harvard University Press. London. William Heinemann Ltd. 1936. Online version at the Perseus Digital Library. Greek text available from the same website.

Children of Poseidon
Demigods in classical mythology